The Pentax K-3 Mark III is a Digital single-lens reflex camera released by Ricoh Imaging on 23 April 2021. It was developed as the flagship model of the Pentax APS-C camera range. It has a 1/8000 conventional and 1/16,000 electronic shutter (via firmware update). It also has familiar Pentax features, such as Astrotracer, Pixel Shift Resolution, AA Filter simulator, as well as Depth-of-field, Shutter, and Motion Bracketing. This is the first Pentax camera with 4K video recording and a touchscreen.

References

External Links

Cameras introduced in 2021
Live-preview digital cameras
K-3 III
Pentax K-mount cameras